ForPlay is the first EP by American indie rock band Saint Motel.  The album had a music video for every song that was also included on the CD itself.

"Dear Dictator" was featured in HBO's 2013 trailer for Boardwalk Empire.

Critical reception 
Jim Fusilli of the Wall Street Journal labeled the music as "garage-glam" and Drew Kennedy from BMI wrote "Saint Motel demonstrates their unique ability to seamlessly intertwine melody with melodrama without diminishing the power of either."

Track listing

Personnel
A/J Jackson – lead vocals, guitar, piano
Aaron Sharp – lead guitar
Greg Erwin – drums
Dak Lerdamornpong – bass

References

External links
Trailer

2009 EPs
Saint Motel albums